Victor Marian (born 10 September 1984, in Chișinău) is a Moldovan professional football player. He plays for FC Costuleni of the Moldovan National Division.

External links
 

1984 births
Living people
Moldovan footballers
Moldova international footballers
AFC Rocar București players
Moldovan expatriate footballers
Expatriate footballers in Romania
Association football midfielders